UI data binding is a software design pattern to simplify development of GUI applications.  UI data binding binds UI elements to an application domain model. Most frameworks employ the Observer pattern as the underlying binding mechanism.  To work efficiently, UI data binding has to address input validation and data type mapping.

A bound control is a widget whose value is tied or bound to a field in a recordset (e.g., a column in a row of a table).  Changes made to data within the control are automatically saved to the database when the control's exit event triggers.

Example 
<TextBlock Text="{Binding Username}" />
public class ExampleViewModel
{
    public string Username { get; set; }
}

Data binding frameworks and tools

Delphi 
 DSharp third-party data binding tool
 OpenWire Visual Live Binding - third-party visual data binding tool

Java 
 JFace Data Binding
 JavaFX Property

.NET 
 Windows Forms data binding overview
 WPF data binding overview
 Unity 3D data binding framework (available in modifications for NGUI, iGUI and EZGUI libraries)

JavaScript 
 Angular
 AngularJS
 Backbone.js
 Ember.js
 Datum.js
 knockout.js
 Meteor, via its Blaze live update engine
 OpenUI5
 React
 Vue.js

See also
 Data binding

References

Data management
Software design patterns